USS Schuyler (AK-209) was an  that was constructed for the US Navy during the closing period of World War II. She served with distinction in the Pacific Ocean theatre of operations and returned home in 1946 to be placed into the reserve "mothball" fleet where she silently remained until she was scrapped in 1971.

Construction
Schuyler was laid down under US Maritime Commission (MARCOM) contract, MC hull 2163, on 27 May 1944, by Leathem D. Smith Shipbuilding Company, Sturgeon Bay, Wisconsin; sponsored by Miss Marilyn Hughes; acquired by the Navy on 20 June 1945; and commissioned on 13 July 1945, at Galveston, Texas.

Service history

World War II service
Schuyler loaded cargo at Gulfport, Mississippi, and Mobile, Alabama, and sailed from the latter port on 9 August 1945 for the Pacific Ocean. She arrived at Leyte on 28 September; but, due to the end of the war, neither the cargo nor the ship was required there. She remained in the Philippine Islands until the cargo was purchased by the United Nations Relief and Rehabilitation Administration for distribution in China.

The ship then proceeded to Shanghai and discharged her cargo there between 18 January and 22 March. She arrived at Yokosuka on 27 March, was decommissioned and simultaneously returned to the War Shipping Administration (WSA) on 22 April 1946, and struck from the Navy List on 5 June 1946.

Post-war inactivation
After service under charter to the Japanese government, the ship was laid up on 10 December 1954 in the National Defense Reserve Fleet at Olympia, Washington, where she remained until sold on 5 February 1971, for $34,385 and scrapping.

Notes 

Citations

Bibliography 

Online resources

External links

 

Alamosa-class cargo ships
Ships built in Sturgeon Bay, Wisconsin
1944 ships
World War II auxiliary ships of the United States
Schuyler County, New York
Schuyler County, Illinois
Schuyler County, Missouri